Okorie is a Nigerian surname of Igbo origin. The surname means "born on Orie" in Igbo, with Orie being one of the days of the Igbo week. Okorie is a Nigerian native name of the Igbo tribe, which represents a strong male son of the land, born on a pronounced Great Market Day called Orie.
 Notable people with the surname include:

Angela Okorie, Nigerian actress
Chima Okorie (born 1968), Nigerian former footballer
Domingo Okorie, Nigerian professor of chemistry
Ikechukwu Okorie (born 1993), Nigerian footballer
Melatu Uche Okorie (born 1975), Nigerian-born Irish author
Nick Okorie (born 1988), American professional basketball player
Patrick Nnaemeka Okorie (born 1990), Nigerian singer and songwriter known by the stage name Patoranking

Igbo-language surnames